Mona Sulaiman (9 June 1942 – 21 December 2017) was a Filipino sprinter who competed at the Asian Games and the Summer Olympics.

Early life
Mona Sulaiman was born in a barrio in Cotabato on 9 June 1942 to Kudelat and Aminan Sulaiman, who were Muslims.

Career
Sulaiman started her career competing in regional meets. She competed at the 1962 Asian Games in Jakarta where she won gold medals in the 100 and 200 metre sprints and relay events. She also garnered a bronze medal in the shot put event at the same tournament.

She competed at the Summer Olympics in the 100 metres event at the 1960 and the 1964 editions.

Sulaiman also excelled in the disciplines of pentathlon and discus throw.

Post-retirement
Sulaiman qualified for the 1966 Asian Games but opted not to participate reportedly for refusing to undergo a gender test. Her physique and speed made some people question her gender. She retired from competitive play and worked in the private sector until the 1990s when she was hired by the Philippine Sports Commission to serve as consultants for the national athletics team. Sulaiman was inducted to the PSC Hall of Fame in January 2016.

Health and death
In October 2016, Sulaiman was reportedly confined to a wheelchair. She died in Manila on 21 December 2017. She was 75.

Legacy
Solaiman and bowler Bong Coo share the Asian Games record for the most gold medals won by a Filipino athlete - male or female - in a single edition. In the 1962 Asian Games in Jakarta, she won three gold medals (100 meter dash, 200 meter dash, and 4100 meter relay). Solaiman was among the second group of Filipino sports legends inducted into the Philippine Sports Hall of Fame on January 25, 2016 at the Century Park Hotel in Manila.

References

External links
 

1942 births
2017 deaths
Athletes (track and field) at the 1960 Summer Olympics
Athletes (track and field) at the 1964 Summer Olympics
Athletes (track and field) at the 1962 Asian Games
Medalists at the 1962 Asian Games
Filipino female sprinters
Olympic track and field athletes of the Philippines
People from Cotabato
Asian Games medalists in athletics (track and field)
Asian Games gold medalists for the Philippines
Asian Games bronze medalists for the Philippines
Philippine Sports Hall of Fame inductees
Olympic female sprinters